Poytugʻ or Paytug ( or) is a city in Andijan Region, Uzbekistan. It is the administrative center of Izboskan District. Its population was 19,389 in 1989, 29,200 in 2003, and 26,000 in 2016.

References

Populated places in Andijan Region
Cities in Uzbekistan